Ville-Veikko Eerola (born April 9, 1992) is a Finnish ice hockey defenceman. His is currently playing with Lahti Pelicans in the Finnish SM-liiga.

Eerola made his SM-liiga debut playing with Lahti Pelicans during the 2012–13 SM-liiga season.

References

External links

1992 births
Living people
People from Hämeenlinna
Finnish ice hockey defencemen
Lahti Pelicans players
Sportspeople from Kanta-Häme
21st-century Finnish people